The Schirmacher Oasis (or Schirmacher Lake Plateau) is a  long and up to  wide ice-free plateau with more than 100 freshwater lakes.

Geography

The oasis is located between the edge of the Antarctic Ice Sheet and the Novolazarevskaya Nivl Ice Shelf.
On the northern edge of the oasis are so-called epishelf lakes, bays separated from the ocean which are connected with the ocean underneath the surface of the ice. Thus, tidal effects can be observed in the lakes. The epishelf lakes can contain either mere freshwater or saltwater which is overlaid by freshwater.
The nunataks Skaly Instituta Geologii Arktiki (Skaly IGA) and Basisny-Kit protrude from the ice sheet. Between the offshore ice sheet and the Wegener Ice Sheet Plateau are the Wohlthat Mountains.

A number of theories exist about the formation of the oasis that include geothermal heating, intense insolation, or the hypothesis that the ice flow is blocked by a geological feature such as a mountain.

Climate

The climate of the Schirmacher Oasis is relatively mild for Antarctic conditions.
Because of the positive radiation balance, the Schirmacher Oasis is regionally classified as a "coastal climate zone".

Flora and fauna

The rocky soil at the Oasis allows growth only for a limited amount of undemanding plants like mosses and lichens.
Animals are also rare at the Oasis. Exceptions are the Antarctic skua, the Antarctic petrel, the snow petrel, and the Wilson's storm petrel. Occasionally, Adélie penguins can be seen at the oasis.

History

At the beginning of 1939 Germany launched an expedition under the command of captain Alfred Ritscher to explore an uncharted area of the Antarctic. They surveyed an area between latitudes 69°10’ S and 76°30’ S and longitudes 11°30 W and 20°00’ E, totaling 600 000 km² and called it Neuschwabenland, or New Swabia. The area was surveyed by two Dornier hydroplanes, Boreas and Passat. One was piloted by Richardheinrich Schirmacher, who, on 3 February 1939, spotted both the oasis and the lake at its centre. Schirmacher named both after himself.

Novolazarevskaya Station

On March 10, 1959, the Soviet Union set up the research station Lazarev on the shelf ice in the region of the Schirmacher Oasis. The station was reinstalled in 1961 into the Oasis and was named Novolazarevskaya. In summer, up to 70 crew members reside at the station. In winter, on average 30 scientists and technicians work at the Novolazarevskaya Station. Research in natural sciences includes geodesy, glaciology, limnology, geomagnetism, geology, biology, meteorology, seismology, and other areas of expertise.
On 20 December 2007 the Russian Bath was built near the station. It is the only glued timber building in Antarctica.

Georg Forster Station

On April 21, 1976, approximately two kilometres from the Russian station Novolazarevskaya and about 120 m ASL, the first German research station, the Georg Forster Station, was launched in Antarctica. In 1987, the station, which was run by the GDR, was named after the German naturalist Georg Forster. During its 17 years of existence, more than 100 scientists had worked at the station. In particular, their ozone measurements gained international recognition.
The station withdrew service in February 1993, and by 1996 the entire station had been dismantled and disposed of.

After the dissolution of the Eastern Bloc, parts of the Schirmacher Oasis counted among the heaviest polluted regions in Antarctica. Polar explorers from the Alfred Wegener Institute for Polar and Marine Research in Bremerhaven and from the Arctic and Antarctic Research Institute in Saint Petersburg disposed of 1016 tons of scrap metal and refuse from the former GDR polar station and the Russian Novolazarevskaya Station.

The site of the former station is marked by a bronze plaque. It has been designated a Historic Site or Monument (HSM 87), following a proposal by Germany to the Antarctic Treaty Consultative Meeting.

Maitri Station

In 1981, India launched the Indian Antarctic Programme. In 1983, the Dakshin Gangotri Station was set up on the shelf ice, about 90 km from the Schirmacher Oasis, but was decommissioned in 1989 due to excessive snow accumulation. In 1988, the Maitri Station was installed in the Schirmacher Oasis, approximately 5 km from Novolazarevskaya.
Maitri is equipped with a meteorological station, as well as a geomagnetic and seismological observatory, and accommodates up to 26 scientists and technicians.

See also
 List of Arctic research stations

References

Plateaus of Antarctica
Princess Astrid Coast
Oases of Antarctica
Landforms of Queen Maud Land
Historic Sites and Monuments of Antarctica